Nicole Bricq (10 June 1947 – 6 August 2017) was a member of the Senate of France, representing the Seine-et-Marne department. She received a degree in private law from Montesquieu University in 1970.

From 1972 on Bricq was a member of the Socialist Party. On 16 May 2012 she was appointed Minister of Ecology, Sustainable Development and Energy in the government of Jean-Marc Ayrault. After the French legislative elections of June 2012, she was appointed Minister for Foreign Trade. She was replaced at the Ministry of Ecology by Delphine Batho. Whereas some members of the government, such as Cécile Duflot, considered this nomination like a promotion, many felt that it was due to the decision taken by Bricq to stop all drilling contracts signed with Shell in French Guiana, a decision that has been reversed since then.

Bricq was one of the earliest supporters of Emmanuel Macron and his party, La République En Marche!, instead of supporting Socialist Party candidate, Benoît Hamon.

On 6 August 2017, Bricq died in hospital in Poitiers after an accidental fall.

References

External links 

 Page on the Senate website

1947 births
2017 deaths
Socialist Party (France) politicians
French Senators of the Fifth Republic
French Ministers of the Environment
Women members of the Senate (France)
Women government ministers of France
La République En Marche! politicians
Accidental deaths from falls
Senators of Seine-et-Marne
People from Charente
Politicians from Nouvelle-Aquitaine
University of Bordeaux alumni
21st-century French women